Anne Lyon (née Murray), Countess of Kinghorne  (1579 – 27 February 1618), was a Scottish courtier said to be the mistress of James VI of Scotland.

Fair Mistress Anne Murray
Anne Murray was a daughter of John Murray, 1st Earl of Tullibardine, Master of the King's Household and Catherine Drummond, daughter of David, 2nd Lord Drummond.

Her name was sometimes written "Agnes", in correspondence and in anonymous verses in her praise which include anagrams such as the acrostic sonnet "AMAGEMURNSAYAM", and a sonnet with the anagram "AGE MURNES AYE".

Her sister Lilias Murray married John Grant of Freuchie in June 1591. James VI and John Wemyss of Logie attended the wedding at Tullibardine, and performed in a masque. On the same day the Earl of Bothwell escaped from Edinburgh Castle.

A Dutch ambassador in 1594, Walraven III van Brederode, mentioned that she or her sister was a lady in waiting to Anne of Denmark. One of her brothers was killed at battle of Glenlivet on 3 October 1594. Anne of Denmark paid for updates to her wardrobe in October 1594, giving her a new bodice and sleeves, and silver "cordons" to embroider an existing gown. The record suggests that Anne Murray was then a member of the queen's household.

Anne Murray was said to be the mistress of King James VI. This identification comes from two poems written by the king, given titles "A Dreame on his Mistres My Ladie Glammis" and "A Complaint on his Mistressis Absence from Court". Her husband's aristocratic title was "Lord Glamis".

The "Complaint" poem compares her absence from court to a garland missing its flower, and a button or a jewel, a "chatton" missing its gemstone (lines 50-51);The court as garland lacks the cheefest floureThe court a chatton toome that lacks her stone(modernised)The court is a garland missing her chiefest flowerThe court is an empty button that lacks her gemstone.

Her absence, perhaps due to the forthcoming marriage, will transform the court to Hades, a kind of hell; "Since by thy absence heaven in hell is changed: And we as Divells in Plutoes court are ranged" (lines 41-2).

The "Dream" poem includes the imagery of gifts of an empty gold locket, a "tablet" and an amethyst. In the dream, the amethyst with its traditional healing powers will encourage the king's unswerving devotion. The locket is the "chasteness", the chastity of the king's mistress, and her wandering thoughts are like the trails of enamel on the case. On one leaf of the case there is a picture of a naked man sheltered from the sun in a green forest. This image represents the pleasure his mistress's singing voice brings the court. The other leaf shows the sun amidst the stars, as his mistress is the first among the ladies of the court. Inside the locket there is an image of cupid with his bow, but as yet, no picture of the king's mistress. By these two dream tokens the king imagines their love is knit together until cut by the fate "Atrope", Atropos.

A letter from John Carey, son of Henry Carey, governor of Berwick-upon-Tweed to Cecil, 10 May 1595, discussing her marriage calls her "fayre Mistris Ann Murray the Kinges Mistris". Carey's letter shows that Anne Murray was known as the king's mistress in London, and perhaps the poem "A Dreame on his Mistres" had circulated in manuscript at the English court.

Marriage
In May 1595, Anne Lyon married Patrick Lyon, 9th Lord Glamis who would later become the Earl of Kinghorne, at Stirling. In early modern Scotland married women did not usually adopt their husband's surnames. Lyon was the son of John Lyon, 8th Lord Glamis and Elizabeth Abernethy. His estates and affairs were managed by his uncle, the Thomas Lyon, Master of Glamis.

James VI bought Anne Murray, his rumoured mistress, a trousseau of clothes, including a three-tailed gown of cloth of silver which she probably wore on her wedding day. The king and queen planned to come to the wedding banquet on 1 June, to be celebrated with "great triumph" at Stirling Castle, but Anne of Denmark was ill again, rumoured to have suffered a miscarriage. Roger Aston wrote that the banquet was to be held at the Countess of Mar's new house in Stirling, perhaps Mar's Wark, followed by celebrations at Gask, the house of the Laird of Tullibardine.

John Carey thought the wedding would be held at Linlithgow, and some sources following Carey's letter state the wedding took place in June at Linlithgow. Anne of Denmark set out from Linlithgow to Stirling on 30 May for the wedding banquet but fell ill after her horse was unruly. Neither James VI or Anne of Denmark attended the wedding because Anne was ill at Linlithgow. She was thought to be pregnant. James VI invited the Earl of Mar to join merry making at Gask in July 1595 and this was probably the "in-fare" feast for the wedding.

Before the wedding, Anne Murray was said to be trying to make the marriage celebrations a peaceful occasion to bring together factions at court. The marriage was of political significance in Scotland, controversially arranged by the Earl of Mar, whose mother Annabell was a Tullibardine Murray, without the knowledge of Patrick's uncle, the Master of Glamis. The Master of Glamis wanted Patrick Lyon to marry a sister of the Laird of Cessford. Mar's involvement was part of his feud with the Chancellor of Scotland, John Maitland of Thirlestane.

John Colville wrote about the marriage of "Mestres Annas", as "A mariage laitlie contracted heir betwix the young Lord Glammes and Tillibarn his dochter will walkin (waken) again the greif betwix .a (Mar) and .h (Master of Glamis), for .h (Glamis) is marveluislie displesed tharwith". Colville felt that whatever the facts were, the Master of Glamis thought that Mar had practiced to his prejudice.

At Blair Castle a spade from Sri Lanka is said to have been a gift from Patrick Lyon to Anne Murray in 1594.

James VI and the Seven Pearls of Lochleven
In 1593 James VI was linked with a member of the Lyon family, Euphemia Douglas, daughter of Sir William Douglas of Lochleven, Earl of Morton and Agnes Leslie. She married the Master of Glamis in 1586. She and her sisters were sometimes called the "Seven Pearls of Lochleven". She may then have been known as "Lady Glamis".

Dr Tobias Matthew, Bishop of Durham wrote of the "king's affection to the Lady Morton's daughter", and that she might be connected with the Earl of Bothwell's schemes, and draw a person of "greater estate" into Elizabeth's devotion. In a second letter Matthew mentioned a mystery concerning the "king's love", Lady Morton's daughter and the contents of a letter intercepted by Bothwell concerning the succession to the English throne intended for a person of "great estate". Euphemia Douglas however, was not the king's mistress mentioned in Carey's letters, and  it also possible that Matthew's story concerned another of the seven Douglas of Lochleven sisters.

Family
The children of Anne Murray and Patrick Lyon, 1st Earl of Kinghorne included:
 James Lyon (d. August 1641)
 Patrick Lyon (rumoured along with his brother Frederick and sister Anne to be children of King James VI and I) 
 Frederick Lyon (d. 1660)
 Anne Lyon (d. 8 February 1637), who married William Hay, 10th Earl of Erroll.
 Jean Lyon (d. 2 February 1618)
 John Lyon, 2nd Earl of Kinghorne (13 August 1596 - 12 May 1646)

She died on 27 February 1618.

References

Sources and external links
 The Peerage .com
 Allan Westcott, New Poems by James I of England (New York, 1911).
 J. Bain, Calendar of Border Papers, vol. 1 (Edinburgh, 1894).
 J. Bain, Calendar of Border Papers, vol. 2 (Edinburgh, 1894).

1579 births
1618 deaths
Mistresses of Scottish royalty
Anne Murray
Kinghorne
16th-century Scottish women
17th-century Scottish women
16th-century Scottish people
17th-century Scottish people
Daughters of Scottish earls
Anne
Anne